Jacob Koloman Freud (1815–1896) was the father of Sigmund Freud, the founder of psychoanalysis.

Born in town of Tysmenytsia in the Kingdom of Galicia and Lodomeria (now in Ukraine), and from a Hasidic background though himself an enlightened Jew of the Haskalah, he mainly earned his living as a wool merchant.

Families
	
Jacob Freud was the son of Schlomo Freud and Pepi, née Hoffmann.
Jacob Freud married three times, with two children coming from his first marriage, and eight children from his third marriage to Amalia Freud, twenty years his junior.  His first wife was Sally, and his second wife was Rebecca. Jacob's eldest son from his first marriage became a father a year before Sigmund - the first son of Jacob's third marriage - was born; so that Sigmund was an uncle at birth, with his nephew John a constant (and older) playmate in his early years. Ernest Jones speculates that the unusual family background may have prompted Sigmund - the eldest but third son - into an early interest in family dynamics.

Character
By all accounts, Jacob Freud was a genial, unassuming character with a "Micawberish" streak of optimism: 
Sigmund would write warmly of "his characteristic mixture of deep wisdom and fantastic lightheartedness". Yet there is evidence that Jacob's meekness in the face of anti-Semitic bullying also disturbed Sigmund profoundly. Much of the latter's ambition, his combativeness, and his subsequent quest for powerful father figures such as Ernst Brücke and Josef Breuer, may be traced back to his ambivalence about his own yielding and 'vague' father.

See also
 Father complex
 Family nexus
 Freud family
 Wilhelm Fliess

References

Further reading 
Marianne Krüll, Freud and his Father (1979)
Leonard Shengold, 'Freud and Josef', in M. Kanzer ed, The Unconscious Today (1971)

1815 births
1896 deaths
People from Tysmenytsia
Jacob
Jews from Galicia (Eastern Europe)
People from the Kingdom of Galicia and Lodomeria
Ukrainian Jews
Austro-Hungarian Jews
People of the Haskalah